GDOS may refer to:
 Glow discharge optical spectroscopy
 Graphics Device Operating System, part of the Graphics Environment Manager
 Green's Dictionary of Slang
 GDOS, an operating system for the DISCiPLE disk interface of the ZX Spectrum

See also 
 GDO (disambiguation)